Joel Otterson (born in Inglewood, CA, 1959, United States) is an American artist who lives and works in Los Angeles, CA.

Professional life and education
Otterson received his BFA at Parsons School of Design, New York, NY in 1982.  In 1983, Otterson exhibited for the first time at Gallery Nature Morte in Manhattan. He would have exhibitions with other notable artists together with artists like Richard Prince, Jeff Koons, and Haim Steinbach.

Joel Otterson is a sculptor who for 30+ years has worked his way through the house and remade everything inside it.  His hybrid mash-ups of our domestic environment question our relationship to the home and to each other. His work addresses the gender of objects, their place in culture and what it means to be American.  Otterson employs a diverse array of materials such as copper pipe, concrete, and blown glass, with techniques such as woodworking, pottery, and needlework.

Selected exhibitions
Otterson has shown his work internationally at venues such as The Museum of Modern Art (PROJECT series, 1987), the Venice Biennale (1993), the Hammer Museum (Made in L.A, 2012), Whitney Museum of American Art (2014 Whitney Biennial) for which he received much praise, and Maloney Fine Art.

Collections
Otterson’s work is in the permanent collections of Cincinnati Art Museum, Israel Museum, The Broad Foundation (by Edythe and Eli Broad), and the Jewish Museum.

References and notes

External links
Official website of Joel Otterson

1959 births
Living people
American artists